Alle may refer to:
The German name for the Łyna River, a river since 1945 in Poland and the Russian Kaliningrad Oblast
Alle, Switzerland, a community in the Swiss canton of Jura
Alle, Belgium in the province of Namur, Belgium
Little auk (Alle alle), a bird which is the only member of the genus Alle
August Alle (1890–1952), Estonian writer
Moritz Allé (1837–1913), Austrian mathematician
Alle language, a language of Ethiopia

See also
Alleé (landscape avenue)
Alles (disambiguation)
All (disambiguation)